The 49th Judan began on 20 June 2010 and concluded on 29 April 2011. Challenger Iyama Yuta Meijin defeated title holder Cho U, who won the previous two tournaments.

Tournament

Winners section

Losers section

Finals

References

2011 in go
Go competitions in Japan